Gene Taylor may refer to:

Gene Taylor (American football) (born 1962), wide receiver
Gene Taylor (athletic director) (born 1957), NCAA Division I athletic director
Gene Taylor (Mississippi politician) (born 1953), former U.S. Representative from Mississippi
Gene Taylor (Missouri politician) (1928–1998), former U.S. Representative from Missouri
Gene Taylor (pianist) (1952–2021), American pianist
Gene Taylor (bassist) (1929–2001), American jazz musician
Gene Taylor (TV and radio personality) (1947–2001), American comedian, TV and radio host and writer

See also
Eugene Taylor (disambiguation)
Jean Taylor (disambiguation)